Sainte-Émélie-de-l'Énergie is a municipality in the Lanaudière region of Quebec, Canada, part of the Matawinie Regional County Municipality.

Geography
The territory of Sainte-Émélie-de-l'Énergie extends along the Noire River valley in the foothills of the Laurentian Mountains. The village itself is located at the intersection of Routes 131 and 347, in a broad valley called the Grand Lanaudière Corridor, which marks the transition between the Lower and Upper Laurentians. Route 131 winds north through the Noire River valley to Saint-Zénon and Route 347 goes through the Great Corridor to Saint-Côme.

Sainte-Émélie-de-l'Énergie is located in the heart of the Laurentian hardwood zone and its hills are covered by a mixed forest. Tree species include sugar maple, yellow birch and white birch.

History
One of the first settlers was Jean-Antoine Leprohon who arrived in 1854. He was an employee of the Quebec Parliament but had an ambition to found a colony or settlement just like his cousin Barthélemy Joliette who was the founder of the City of Joliette. In 1870, the Parish of Sainte-Emmélie-de-l'Énergie was formed. This name honors the memory of Émélie or Emmélie, the wife of Leprohon, whereas the word Énergie (French for "energy") may have referred to the exuberance of his wife or to the rallying cry that Leprohon had to use to keep the other settlers stay around him: "we need energetic settlers here."

In 1884, the Parish Municipality of Sainte-Émélie-de-l'Énergie was established. On May 30, 1924, a large fire engulfed the village, destroying 60 homes and the church. In 1994, the parish municipality changed status to become a municipality.

Demographics

Population

Private dwellings occupied by usual residents: 841 (total dwellings: 1142)

Language
Mother tongue:
 English as first language: 1.1%
 French as first language: 96.6%
 English and French as first language: 0.6%
 Other as first language: 1.1%

Education

The Commission scolaire des Samares operates francophone public schools
 École de l'Ami-Soleil 

The Sir Wilfrid Laurier School Board operates anglophone public schools, including:
 Joliette Elementary School in Saint-Charles-Borromée
 Joliette High School in Joliette

See also
List of municipalities in Quebec

References

Incorporated places in Lanaudière
Municipalities in Quebec
Matawinie Regional County Municipality